The Oaxaca giant deer mouse (Megadontomys cryophilus) is a species of rodent in the family Cricetidae.
It is found only in Mexico.

References

Sources
Musser, G. G. and M. D. Carleton. 2005. Superfamily Muroidea. pp. 894–1531 in Mammal Species of the World a Taxonomic and Geographic Reference. D. E. Wilson and D. M. Reeder eds. Johns Hopkins University Press, Baltimore.

Megadontomys
Mammals described in 1964
Taxonomy articles created by Polbot